Silver Creek is a  stream located in the White Mountains of Arizona north of Show Low. It is a tributary of the Little Colorado River.  It is also the site of a supervolcano that erupted 18.8 million years ago.

Fish species 
 Rainbow trout
 Brown trout

See also
 List of rivers of Arizona

References

External links 
 Arizona Boating Locations Facilities Map
 Arizona Fishing Locations Map

Rivers of the Mogollon Rim
White Mountains (Arizona)
Rivers of Arizona
Rivers of Navajo County, Arizona